Cut and Shoot is a city in eastern Montgomery County, Texas, United States, about  east of Conroe and  north of Houston. Until 2006, Cut and Shoot was considered and called a "town". Then, the town council elected for it to be considered and referred to as a "city".  The population was 1,087 at the 2020 census.

Name
According to one local legend, Cut and Shoot was named after a 1912 community confrontation that almost led to violence. According to differing versions of the story, the dispute was over:
The design of a new steeple for the town's only church,
The issue of who should be allowed to preach there, or
The conflicting land claims among church members.

Whatever the circumstances were, a small boy at the scene reportedly said he was scared and declared, "I'm going to cut around the corner and shoot through the bushes in a minute!" This statement apparently stayed in the residents' minds and was eventually adopted as the town's name. "Cut and Shoot" has frequently been noted on lists of unusual place names.

History
The town of Cut and Shoot gained fame when local boxer Roy Harris, a heavyweight contender, fought Floyd Patterson for the heavyweight title in 1958.  Harris appeared on the cover of Sports Illustrated and was featured in LIFE.  So much mail was addressed to "Roy Harris, Cut and Shoot, Texas" that the U. S. Postal Service granted a franchise post office to the town.

Population statistics were not reported for the community until the mid-1970s, when the number of residents was 50. By 1980, the incorporated community reported a population of 809, had a new town hall, and supported a school and several businesses.

Geography

Demographics

As of the 2020 United States census, there were 1,087 people, 345 households, and 248 families residing in the city.

As of the 2010 United States Census, there were 1,070 people, 371 households, and 289 families residing in the town. The population density was 396.3 people per square mile (152.9/km).The racial makeup of the town was 87.2% White, 1.0% African American, 0.8% Native American, 0.2% Asian, 0.1% Native Hawaiian 8.2% from other races, and 2.4% from two or more races. Hispanic or Latino of any race were 15.0% of the population.

Out of 371 households, 77.9% are family households, 34.5% with children under 18 years. 63.6% were husband-wife families. Out of 371 households, 22.1% were non-family households, with 18.1% of householders living alone. The average household size was 2.88; the average family size was 3.23.

27.9% of the population is under the age of 18. 11.9% are over the age of 65. The median age is 37.1. 50.6% of the population is female.

As of 2000, The median income for a household in the town was $40,455, and the median income for a family was $47,404. Males had a median income of $36,719 versus $20,833 for females. The per capita income for the town was $15,482. About 5.7% of families and 8.9% of the population were below the poverty line, including 7.5% of those under age 18 and 15.5% of those age 65 or over.

Government and infrastructure 
Cut and Shoot is governed locally by an elected mayor and five at-large city council positions. As of June 2022, the mayor is Nyla Akin Dalhaus. City council members, also known as Aldermen, are Bill Green, Jason Wieghat, Thomas Robinson, Charlie Musgrove, and Ryan Wallace.

87% of Cut and Shoot is in Texas Senate District 3, represented by Republican Robert Nichols. The other 13% is in District 4, represented by Republican Brandon Creighton. Cut and Shoot is in District 16 of the Texas House of Representatives, represented by Republican Will Metcalf.

In Congress, Cut and Shoot is represented in the Senate by Republicans John Cornyn and Ted Cruz, and in the House of Representatives, Cut and Shoot is in District 8, represented by Kevin Brady.

The City of Cut and Shoot is one of the very few statewide municipalities that has no ad valorem property tax within its city limits. The only tax based city income is from a 1% sales tax on taxable goods and services within the city limits.

The United States Postal Service Cut and Shoot Post Office is located at 13985 Texas State Highway 105 East.

Cut And Shoot includes Groceville, an unincorporated populated place.

Education
Cut and Shoot is within the Conroe Independent School District and the Lone Star College System (formerly North Harris Montgomery Community College District).

Schools serving Cut and Shoot include Austin Elementary School, Grangerland Intermediate School, Moorhead Junior High School, and Caney Creek High School

Residents of Conroe ISD (and therefore Cut and Shoot) are served by the Lone Star College System (formerly North Harris Montgomery Community College).

Notable people

 Roy Harris, a heavyweight boxer
 Debra Maffett, named Miss America 1983, hailed from Cut and Shoot

References

External links

City of Cut And Shoot
 Robin N. Montgomery, "CUT AND SHOOT, TX," Handbook of Texas Online, accessed October 29, 2012. Published by the Texas State Historical Association.

Cities in Texas
Cities in Montgomery County, Texas
Greater Houston